"Calentura" is a song by Puerto Rican reggaetón singer-songwriter Yandel. It was written and produced by himself, Egbert Rosa (a.k.a. Haze), Gabriel Lebrón and Auberto Duprey (a.k.a. Los Harmónicos). It was released as the lead single off his upcoming third studio album Dangerous on March 16, 2015. An official remix was released on May 15, 2015, featuring Puerto Rican rapper Tempo. A trap version was released on September 4, 2015, featuring US rapper Lil Jon.

Music video
The music video for the song was directed by longtime director Jessy Terrero, filmed in Caracas, Venezuela and released through his Vevo / YouTube channel on March 16, 2015. The video shows body painted girls and soft erotic scenes which has made the video were described as 'sexy and daring'. The music video for the remix version featuring Tempo was also directed by Terrero and was released on May 15, 2015.

Release history

Charts

Certifications

See also
List of Billboard number-one Latin songs of 2015

References

2015 singles
Yandel songs
Spanish-language songs
Songs written by Yandel
Sony Music Latin singles
Music videos directed by Jessy Terrero
2015 songs